Ana Ibis Fernández Valle (born August 3, 1973) is a Cuban volleyball player.

She was born in Sancti Spíritus. She won a gold medal with the Cuban team at the 1994 FIVB Volleyball Women's World Championship. She is three times Olympic Champion as a member of the Cuban winning team in 1992, 1996, and 2000.

Individual awards
 1998 World Championship "Best Spiker"

References

External links

1973 births
Living people
People from Sancti Spíritus
Cuban women's volleyball players
Olympic volleyball players of Cuba
Volleyball players at the 1992 Summer Olympics
Volleyball players at the 1996 Summer Olympics
Volleyball players at the 2000 Summer Olympics
Volleyball players at the 2004 Summer Olympics
Olympic gold medalists for Cuba
Olympic bronze medalists for Cuba
Cuban expatriate sportspeople in Spain
Expatriate volleyball players in Spain
Olympic medalists in volleyball
Medalists at the 2004 Summer Olympics
Medalists at the 2000 Summer Olympics
Medalists at the 1996 Summer Olympics
Medalists at the 1992 Summer Olympics
Pan American Games medalists in volleyball
Pan American Games gold medalists for Cuba
Pan American Games silver medalists for Cuba
Medalists at the 1995 Pan American Games
Medalists at the 1999 Pan American Games